The city of Jyväskylä, Finland is divided into 14 wards, which are further divided into 89 districts.

Wards of Jyväskylä 
This is a list of the 14 wards of Jyväskylä by population as of June 2012

Districts of Jyväskylä 
This is a list of the districts in the official order.

References

External links

 Map of Jyväskylä, districts visible

 Districts of Jyvaskyla
Jyvaskyla